The 2010 Akron Zips men's soccer team represented the University of Akron during the 2010 NCAA Division I men's soccer season. The Zips finished the season winning the 2010 NCAA Division I Men's Soccer Championship, making it the first time in their history to win the national title.

Roster 
The 2010 Akron Zips roster.

Match results

Key 

 Home team is listed on the right

Preseason

Regular season

MAC tournament 

Numbers in parenthesis (#) represent tournament seed.

NCAA tournament 

Numbers in parenthesis (#) represent tournament seed.

NCAA College Cup

Statistics

Goalscorers 

The list is sorted by shirt number when total goals are equal.

Transfers

In 

|-
|}
 11	Darren Mattocks	F	Fr.	6-0	165	Portmore, Jamaica / Bridgeport HS
 23	Andrian McAdams	GK	Fr.	6-0	170	Oberlin, Ohio / Oberlin HS
 18	Martin Ontiveros	MF	Fr.	5-9	145	Pharr, Texas / Edison Academic Center [Fla.]
 19	McKauly Tulloch	F	Fr.	6-1	180	Kingston, Jamaica / St. George's College HS

Out

Awards

References 

Akron Zips
Akron Zips men's soccer seasons
Akron Zips
2010 NCAA Division I Men's Soccer Tournament participants
Akron
Akron Zips
NCAA Division I Men's Soccer Tournament-winning seasons
NCAA Division I Men's Soccer Tournament College Cup seasons